Vine pull schemes are programs whereby grape growers receive a financial incentive to pull up their grape vines, a process known as arrachage in French. A large program of this kind was initiated by the European Union (EU) in 1988 to reduce the wine lake glut from overproduction and declining demand. This was the equivalent to the entire vineyard area of the world's fourth largest grower of grapes, the United States. The EU has recently resumed a vine pull scheme and Plan Bordeaux proposes additional vine pulls to increase prices for generic Bordeaux wine.

It is believed that this has contributed to the "global wine shortage". Research by America's Morgan Stanley financial services firm says demand for wine "exceeded supply by 300m cases in 2012".

References

Further reading
 Robinson, Jancis (Ed.) The Oxford Companion to Wine. Oxford: Oxford University Press, second edition, 1999.

Wine terminology